Crazy Life, originally released in 1973 by A&M Records, is the debut album by Canadian singer and songwriter Gino Vannelli.

Six years before Crazy Life came out, Vannelli had gained a recording contract with RCA Canada under the name Van Elli because his real name was viewed "too Italian". However, Van Elli would release only one single under that moniker, 1970's "Gina Bold", before being dropped. With brothers Joe and Ross, Gino traveled to New York, back to Montreal, and again to Los Angeles where he was discovered by producer Herb Alpert and gave him a demo tape. Alpert signed Vannelli on the condition he produce the singer’s first album, which Gino agreed to.

Before signing with A&M, Vannelli had written several albums' worth of songs, including most of the material on Powerful People and Storm at Sunup – indeed the title track was the only song from Vannelli's Alpert demo to appear on Crazy Life.

Even before its release, Crazy Life gained some airplay on stations in the Vannellis' home city of Montreal, but A&M's support was poor and this meant Crazy Life did not chart in either the US or Canada. The title track has appeared on many later compilations like The Best of Gino Vannelli.

Track listing

References

Albums produced by Herb Alpert
Gino Vannelli albums
1973 debut albums
A&M Records albums